Permassky is a rural locality (a village) in Permasskoye Rural Settlement, Nikolsky District, Vologda Oblast, Russia. The population was 28 as of 2002.

Geography 
The distance to Nikolsk is 45 km, to Permas is 12 km. Tarasovy Loga is the nearest rural locality.

References 

Rural localities in Nikolsky District, Vologda Oblast